Shelby Jensen (born February 8, 2001) is an American wheelchair fencer. She competed at the 2020 Summer Paralympics.

Life 

She studies at Salt Lake Community College.

She competed at the  2019 Pan American Wheelchair Championships, 2019 U-23 Wheelchair World Championships, winning a bronze medal, and 2019 Wheelchair Fencing World Championships. She competes in épée, foil and sabre.

References

External links 

 Meet fencer Shelby Jensen! Watch this Utah Paralympian in action before she goes to Tokyo (ksl.com) August 17, 2021
Millcreek 19-year-old overcomes a stroke to become a world class parafencer (fox13now.com) June 28, 2020
Millcreek parafencer representing Team USA at Tokyo Paralympics | KSL.com - June 25, 2021
Redefining Disability: Shelby Jensen and the Game of Physical Chess (aka Parafencing) on Apple Podcasts
Fencing’s Teenage Psychological Warrior - Sports N Spokes

2001 births
Living people
Paralympic wheelchair fencers of the United States
American female foil fencers
Wheelchair fencers at the 2020 Summer Paralympics
21st-century American women
American female sabre fencers
American female épée fencers